The women's 100 metres hurdles event at the 2016 Summer Olympics took place between 16–17 August at the Olympic Stadium.

Summary
The United States came into this event with the top 25 performances and top 7 athletes in the world in 2016.  But only three athletes can come from one country.  World #1 Kendra Harrison failed to qualify at the United States Olympic Trials.  Three weeks after the trials, she set the world record, surpassing Yordanka Donkova's 28 year old mark.  World #4 Jasmin Stowers, #6 Queen Harrison and #7 Sharika Nelvis also were beaten at the Trials.

The semi-finals foretold the dominance of the American team as they each won one of the three semi finals.  In the final, Brianna Rollins had already achieved the lead by the first hurdle and by the second hurdle it was clear her closest pursuer was Nia Ali.  Sisters Cindy Ofili and Tiffany Porter, American born but competing for Great Britain, their mother's homeland, were even in the third-place position.  By the fourth barrier, Kristi Castlin was in a battle for last place with Phylicia George and Cindy Roleder, half a stride behind Rollins.  Between the fourth and sixth hurdles, Castlin got rolling, gaining and then passing Pedrya Seymour, Porter and finally over the last hurdle, Ofili.  Rollins had a clear one metre victory.  On the run in, Castlin came very close to Ali as Ofili gave her best desperate lean.

It was an American sweep.  The United States has swept the men's 110 metres hurdles six times, this was the first time for women and the first time the women's event has been swept by any country.  It was also the first time that the United States has swept the medals in an Olympic women's track and field event.

The following evening the medals were presented by Paul Tergat, IOC member, Kenya and Stephanie Hightower, Council Member of the IAAF.

Competition format
The women's 100m Hurdles competition consisted of heats (Round 1), Semifinals and a Final. The fastest competitors from each race in the heats qualified for the Semifinals along with the fastest overall competitors not already qualified that were required to fill the available spaces in the Semifinals. A total of eight competitors qualified for the Final from the Semifinals.

Records
, the existing World and Olympic records were as follows.

Schedule
All times are Brasilia Time (UTC-3)

Results

Heats
Qualification rule: first 3 of each heat (Q) plus the 6 fastest times (q) qualified.

Heat 1

Heat 2

Heat 3

Heat 4

Heat 5

Heat 6

Semifinals

Semifinal 1

Semifinal 2

Semifinal 3

Final

References

Women's 100 metres hurdles
2016
2016 in women's athletics
Women's events at the 2016 Summer Olympics